Foreign relations of Yugoslavia were international relations of the interwar Kingdom of Yugoslavia and the Cold War Socialist Federal Republic of Yugoslavia. During its existence, the country was the founding member of numerous multilateral organizations including the United Nations, Non-Aligned Movement, International Monetary Fund, Group of 77, Group of 15, Central European Initiative and the European Broadcasting Union.

History

Kingdom of Yugoslavia
The Kingdom of Yugoslavia, ruled by the Serbian Karađorđević dynasty, was formed in 1918 by the merger of the provisional State of Slovenes, Croats and Serbs (itself formed from territories of the former Austria-Hungary, encompassing Bosnia and Herzegovina and most of Croatia and Slovenia) and Banat, Bačka and Baranja (that had been part of the Kingdom of Hungary within Austria-Hungary) with the formerly independent Kingdom of Serbia. In the same year, the Kingdom of Montenegro also proclaimed its unification with Serbia, whereas the regions of Kosovo and Vardar Macedonia had become parts of Serbia prior to the unification. The first country in the world to officially recognize the new state was the United States. After the creation of Yugoslavia the newly formed state was a status quo state in Europe which was opposed to revisionist states. In this situation the country prominently was a part of the Little Entente and the first Balkan Pact. Yugoslav accession to the Tripartite Pact resulted in Yugoslav coup d'état and ultimately the Invasion of Yugoslavia.

World War II
During the World War II in Yugoslavia the country was formally represented by the Yugoslav government-in-exile while Yugoslav Partisans headed by Josip Broz Tito progressively gained support of the Allies. At the same time the Anti-Fascist Council for the National Liberation of Yugoslavia challenged the authority of the government in exile and among other issues proposed a review of country's international legal obligations with the aim of annulment or re-negotiation. The new foreign policy was based on the pre-war and war era foreign policy positions of the Communist Party of Yugoslavia which included support for the Soviet Union, Bavarian Soviet Republic, Hungarian Soviet Republic, Yugoslav support for the Spanish Republic, rejection of Anschluss and vocal support for Czechoslovakia’s independence after Munich Agreement. The new socialist Federal Executive Council of Josip Broz Tito was formed on 7 March 1945, recognized by United Kingdom on 20 March 1945, and the Soviet Union and the United States a week after that.

Socialist Yugoslavia

During the first post-war years new Yugoslav state was closely aligned with the Soviet Union and involved into dispute over the Free Territory of Trieste and the Greek Civil War. In May 1945, 4,650 Greek refugees, mostly male members of ELAS, settled in the village of Maglić with the help of Yugoslav government. From 1945 to 1948, it was a sui generis case of Greek extraterritorial jurisdiction. This period was sharply ended in 1948 after the Tito–Stalin split.

Yugoslavia initially pursued development of relations among non-bloc neutral European states as a way to avoid isolation and preserve certain level of independence without alienating major powers. In this period Yugoslavia joined the Second Balkan Pact. Belgrade however perceived that in deeply divided Europe there was shrinking maneuvering space for neutral countries and followed the development of what will be called process of Finlandization with great concern. In 1956 the Belgrade declaration ended the period of significant dependence on the Western bloc. The Declaration guaranteed noninterference in Yugoslavia’s internal affairs and legitimized right to different forms of socialist development in different countries. While declaration failed in achieving lasting rapprochement between the two countries (result of the Yugoslav anxiety over the Hungarian Revolution of 1956) it had an effect on Yugoslav disengagement from the Balkan Pact with NATO member states of Turkey and Greece.

Yugoslavia subsequently discovered new allies among former colonies and mandate territories beyond Europe. Yugoslavia supported Egypt during the Suez Crisis. Yugoslavia developed its relations with India beginning with the time of their concurrent mandate at the UN Security Council from the end of 1949 onward. Yugoslavia  was one of the founding members of the Non-Aligned Movement which enabled this comparatively small and underdeveloped country to play one of the most prominent diplomatic role during the Cold War.

Yugoslav crisis which escalated into breakup of the country and Yugoslav Wars turned into one of the major policy and security issues in the first decade after the end of the Cold War.

Federal Secretaries of Foreign Affairs

Foreign relations

Africa

Americas

Asia

Europe

Oceania

See also
 Ministry of Foreign Affairs (Yugoslavia)
 List of international trips made by Josip Broz Tito
 Foreign relations of Bosnia and Herzegovina
 Foreign relations of Croatia
 Foreign relations of Montenegro
 Foreign relations of North Macedonia
 Foreign relations of Serbia
 Foreign relations of Serbia and Montenegro
 Foreign relations of Slovenia
 Non-Aligned News Agencies Pool

References